Friedrich (Fritz) Carl Heckert (born 28 March 1884 in Chemnitz – died 7 April 1936 in Moscow) was a German politician, co-founder of the Spartacus League and the Communist Party of Germany and a leading member of the Communist International (Comintern). He also briefly served as the Saxon Minister of Economy in 1923.

He is buried in the Kremlin Wall Necropolis.

References

External links

1884 births
1936 deaths
Communist Party of Germany politicians
German Comintern people
People from Chemnitz
Burials at the Kremlin Wall Necropolis
German emigrants to the Soviet Union